Yeddanapudi is a village in Bapatla district of the Indian state of Andhra Pradesh. It is the mandal headquarters of Yeddanapudi mandal in Ongole revenue division.

References 

Villages in Prakasam district